Celtic literature is the body of literature written in one of the Celtic languages, or else it may popularly refer to literature written in other languages which is based on the traditional narratives found in early Celtic literature.

Background 
In the strictly academic context of Celtic studies, the term Celtic literature is used by Celticists to denote any number of bodies of literature written in a Celtic language, encompassing the Irish, Welsh, Cornish, Manx, Scottish Gaelic and Breton languages in either their modern or earlier forms.

Alternatively, the term is often used in a popular context to refer to literature which is written in a non-Celtic language, but originates nonetheless from the Celtic nations or else displays subjects or themes identified as "Celtic".  Examples of these literatures include the medieval Arthurian romances written in the French language, which drew heavily from Celtic sources, or in a modern context literature in the English language by writers of Irish, Welsh, Cornish, Manx, Scottish or Breton extraction.  Literature in Scots and Ulster Scots may also be included within the concept.  In this broader sense, the applicability of the term "Celtic literature" can vary as widely as the use of the term "Celt" itself.

For information on the development of particular national literatures, see: Irish literature, Scottish literature, Welsh literature, Literature in Cornish, Breton literature and Manx literature.

Revival literature in non-Celtic languages

The Gaelic Revival reintroduced Celtic themes into modern literature.  The concept of Celticity encouraged cross-fertilisation between Celtic cultures.

There have been modern texts based around Celtic literature.  Bernard Cornwell writes about the Arthurian legends in his series The Warlord Chronicles.  Other writers of Celtic literature in English include Dylan Thomas and Sian James.

Themes from Celtic Literature within Arthurian Romances
Within many Arthurian texts one can see the influence of Celtic literature and folklore. Examples of Arthurian legends with these components are Marie de France's Lanval, the tale of Sir Gawain and the Green Knight, and in Perceval, The Story of the Grail. In his work "Celtic Elements in Lavenal and Graelent," Cross claims that Lanval is a medieval narrative called, "Brenton Lays" otherwise known as works that claim descent from Celtic tradition. Sir Gawain and the Green Knight is said to contain traditions from early Irish Lore, such as the Beheading test. In addition to Sir Gawain and the Green Knight and Lanval, Perceval, The Story of the Grail contains a combination of these two Celtic themes. While there are other tales whose Celtic elements can be examined, these three are most likely among the best examples.  

A major aspect of Celtic literature within "Lanval" is the theme itself, the story that a fairy mistress falls in love with a mortal. In the story Lanval by Marie de France, an unpopular knight of the court becomes the lover of a mysterious and otherworldly woman. Though he breaks his promise to keep their love a secret, he is eventually reunited with her (Marie de France 154-167). Cross states that, "The influence one medieval romance of Celtic stories involving both the fairy mistress and the Journey to the Otherworld has long since been recognized". While we are never told whether or not Lanval's lover is a fairy, it is most certain that she is a woman of supernatural origin. You can even find a very similar example to the story of "Lanval" in the Irish story called "Aidead Muirchertaig maic Erca". One of the only differences between the original Irish stories and that of "Lanval" is the fact that Marie de France's story is more Christianized and erases any overtly Pagan elements. There are also many other examples of a fairy mistress bestowing favor upon a mortal man within Irish folklore. After providing many examples of this theme within early Celtic literature, Cross states that, "Those given (examples) above demonstrate beyond the possibility of doubt that stories of fee who hanker after mortal earth-born lovers and who visit mortal soil in search of their mates existed in early Celtic tradition…".

In "Sir Gaiwan and the Green Knight" the theme of the Beheading Test is prevalent. According to Alice Buchanan's article: "The Irish Framework of Sir Gawin and the Green Knight," she states: the theme of Beheading texts, which occurs in Arthurian Romances, French, English, and German, from about 1180 – 1380, is derived from an Irish tradition actually existent in a MS. Written before 1106" In "Sir Gaiwan and the Green Knight," it's Gawain's head which is at stake. This is where the "Beheading Game" comes into place. This is when a supernatural challenger offers to let his head be cut off in exchange for a return blow. It is said that the first texts in which the "Beheading Game" is shown is in the Middle Irish tale of Bricriu's Feast. However, the Gawain poets put a spin on the simple beheading game by linking it with themes of truth. It is also frequently stated that the Gawin poet was the first to unite the beheading game with the themes of temptation. 

The Celtic motifs of the "Beheading Game" and temptation are also apparent in the French romance, Perceval, The Story of the Grail and the following continuations of the story by Chretien which are believed to parallel Sir Gawain and the Green Knight in plot (Grant 7).  The early French character known as Caradoc is thought to be one of the first Arthurian characters to use the beheading game as a means to figure out whom his birth father is.  The theme of temptation falls into place as many characters fall into the trap of seduction by other people and also by wizards and other mythological creatures that are known to be of Celtic origin (Chrétien).  	

Celtic mythology also displays itself in "Sir Gaiwain and the Green Knight." Looking at Gaiwan, we see him as the leading leader at the Primary Table in which he is tested by the rulers of the otherworld in terms of his fitness for fame in this world and the next. With this in mind, the "rulers of the otherworld" have a mythical nature to them; there are references to sun gods, and old and new gods. It might seem as though that would be taking the mythological concept and simplifying it, however in Celtic mythology, the traits of individual and groups of gods are not so distinct.

See also
Welsh literature in English
Irish literature
Welsh-language literature
Scottish literature
Breton literature
Cornish literature
Manx literature

References

Bibliography

External links
Aberdeen University Celtic Department Courses and information on the literatures of the Celtic countries
Celtic Literature Library
The Celtic Literature Collective
Corpus of Electronic Texts (CELT) - many old Irish tales and histories available online

Celtic culture